The Apusozoa are an Obazoa phylum comprising several genera of flagellate eukaryotes. They are usually around 5–20 μm in size, and occur in soils and aquatic habitats, where they feed on bacteria. They are grouped together based on the presence of an organic shell or theca under the dorsal surface of the cell.

The name derives from the Ancient Greek words for footless and animal.

This phylum is currently defined as containing the Breviata and the Apusomonadida. However, it currently usually is viewed as paraphyletic, with the Breviata as more basal. The opisthokonts appear to have emerged as sister of the apusomonadida. It has been suggested that the Mantamonadida be classified in Apusozoa.

The ancyromonadida appear to be Varisulca, Planomonadida, shifting them possibly more basal than the Amoebozoa, or less basal. While some classification systems have placed Hemimastigida in Apusozoa, 2018 research indicated that hemimastigotes (/Hemimastix/Spironemidae) are their own supra-kingdom.

Characteristics
The apusomonads have two flagella inserted at right angles, near the anterior of the cell.  They move by gliding, with one flagellum trailing along the side and one directed to the anterior.

The form of the mitochondria varies between the different orders.  Among the apusomonads they have tubular cristae, the ancyromonads flat cristae, and the hemimastigids ambiguous or sacculate cristae.  This characteristic was originally considered a good indicator of relationships, but is now known to vary even among close relatives.

References

External links

 
Amorphea phyla
Taxa named by Thomas Cavalier-Smith